Howell Eugene Lancaster (July 31, 1911 – January 5, 1972) was an American politician. He served as a Democratic member of the Florida House of Representatives from 1949 to 1972.

Life and career 
Lancaster was born in Eugene, Florida. He attended the University of Florida.

In 1949, Lancaster was elected to the Florida House of Representatives, succeeding Carl O. Drummond. He served until 1968, when he was moved to the 15th district, succeeding Leon N. McDonald Sr. He represented five counties.

Lancaster died in January 1972 of a heart attack, at the age of 60.

References 

1911 births
1972 deaths
Democratic Party members of the Florida House of Representatives
20th-century American politicians
University of Florida alumni